A list of films produced in Asia by country of origin:

Afghanistan

Afghan Nomads (The Maldar) (1974) 
An Afghan Village (1974)

Armenia

Azerbaijan

Bahrain
Al-Hajiz (1990)
A Bahraini Tale (2006) 
Botines (2005) (mini)
Za'er (2004)

Bangladesh

Bhutan

Burma

Cambodia

China

Hong Kong

Macau

SPL: Sha Po Lang (2005)
A Trança Feiticeira (1996) 
Zhongyi wuzui (2003)

Georgia

India

Assamese films
List of Bengali films
List of Bollywood films
List of highest-grossing Bollywood films
List of highest-grossing Indian films worldwide
List of Malayalam films
List of Kannada-language films
List of Oriya films
List of Tamil-language films
List of Telugu-language films
Marathi films

Indonesia

Iran

At Five in the Afternoon (2003)
Bashu, the Little Stranger (1989)
Children of Heaven (1997)
The Circle (2000)
The Cow (1969)
Gabbeh (1996)
One Night (2005)
Taste of Cherry (1997)
A Time for Drunken Horses (2000)
White Balloon (1995)
The Wind Will Carry Us (1999)

Iraq

Japan

Jordan

Kazakhstan

Kuwait

Kyrgyzstan

Laos
At the Horizon (2011)
Chanthaly (2013)
Good Morning, Luang Prabang (2008)

Lebanon

Malaysia

Mauritius

Mongolia

Nepal

North Korea

North Vietnam

Oman

Pakistan

Philippines

Palestine

Saudi Arabia

Singapore

South Korea

Sri Lanka

Syria

Tajikistan
Bihisht faqat baroi murdagon (2006) 
Farishtai kitfi rost (2002)
Happiness (Счастье) (2007) 
Identifikatsiya zhelanij (1992)
Komandirovka (1998)
The Silence (1998)
Kosh ba kosh (1993) 
Luna Papa (1999) 
Owora (2006) 
Parvaz-e zanbur (1998)
 Sex & Philosophy (2005) 
Sokout (1998)
Statue of Love (2003) 
Taqvimi intizori (2005) 
True Noon (2009)
V Bagdade vsyo spokoyno (1993)

Thailand

Turkmenistan

Turkey

United Arab Emirates

Uzbekistan

Vietnam

Yemen
A New Day in Old Sana'a (2005)

External links
 Asian film at the Internet Movie Database

Asia

Films